The Mercedes-Benz OM 138 is a diesel engine manufactured by Daimler-Benz. In total, 5,719 units were produced between 1935 and 1940. It was the first diesel engine especially developed and made for a passenger car. The first vehicle powered by the OM 138 was the Mercedes-Benz W 138. The light Mercedes-Benz trucks L 1100 and L 1500 as well as the bus O 1500 were also offered with the OM 138 as an alternative to the standard Otto engine.

Impact 

Daimler-Benz started mass production of the six-cylinder-inline-truck-diesel-engine OM 5 in 1928. Technical improvements allowed an increase in rated rotational speed, thus allowing more power with lower displacement, which made it possible to use the diesel engine as a car engine. Diesel engines have significantly lower running costs than Otto engines; this was the motivation for the adaption of the diesel engine as a car engine. Caused by the lower diesel fuel price compared to petrol, the W 138 was favoured especially by taxi drivers.

Even though the OM 138 was designed a car engine, 3,752 out of 5,719 engines produced were used as truck engines. The OM 138 marked the begin of Daimler-Benz car diesel engine production; however, until the Volkswagen AG introduced its EA 827 in the Golf I in the 1970s, the diesel engine was uncommon as a passenger car engine in Germany.

Development 

The development of a passenger car diesel engine began in the autumn of 1933. Albert Heeß, designer of the Silberpfeil racecar, was the head of development. For the first tests, a straight-six-cylinder truck diesel engine with a displacement of 3.8 L was used. It produced . This engine however caused vibrations that were too strong for prototype car chassis, so that Daimler-Benz tried to develop a less powerful and smaller diesel engine. These engines did not fulfill the requirements. Daimler-Benz decided to use the truck engine again to develop a fitting powerplant for a car. In 1934, the cylinder amount of the truck engine was reduced to four, bore and stroke were kept. Problems such as strong exhaust emissions and rough engine running were solved, mass production could begin in 1935.

Technical description 
The OM 138 is a naturally aspirated and water-cooled inline-four-cylinder diesel engine with precombustion chamber injection,
 wet sump lubrication and OHV valvetrain.

Crankcase 
The crankcase of the OM 138 consists of two parts, a lower part with the lower part of the crankshaft bearing and an upper part with the cylinder block and the camshaft. The lower and upper crankcase parts are connected with pin screws on the horizontal crankshaft centre. The lower crankcase part is strengthened with ribs and made of a light metal alloy. The flange of the gearbox is cast onto the lower crankcase part. The upper crankcase part is made of grey cast iron, it reaches from the crankshaft to the cylinder head. On its front, the upper crankcase part has a bulge that holds the camshaft, so that the camshaft can be driven by the crankshaft using only two gears. The camshaft is supported in five bearings. For camshaft maintenance, the bulge on the crankcase front has a removable cover. Mountings for the starter motor, the alternator and the injection pump are also cast onto the crankcase. For the lubrication of the crank- and camshaft, the crankcase has an oil pipe drilled into.

Pistons and power transmission 
The pistons are made of light metal alloy and have three compression rings as well as one oil ring. They are connected to the crankshaft with I-shape connecting rods made of heat treatable steel. The bearings of the connecting rods are made of a lead bronze alloy and are fixed with a pin. Each connecting rod has a small oil pipe for the lubrication of its bearings. For weight reduction, the connecting rod pins are hollow-drilled. The crankshaft with hardened pins is supported in five bearings and is equipped with counterweights to reduce crankshaft bearing wear. The covers of the crankshaft bearings are mounted with two pin screws each. The flywheel is flanged onto the crankshaft. On the opposite side of the crankshaft, it holds a friction- and vibration damper.

Cylinder head 
The OM 138 has one cylinder head for all four cylinders. The key element in the cylinder head are the precombustion chambers. They are located in a 45° angle above the combustion chamber and placed in a bulge in the cylinder head. Like other early OM diesel engines, the OM 138 has a sieve for fuel spraying purposes between the main combustion chamber and precombustion chamber. The injection nozzles inject fuel into the precombustion chambers, they are mounted on the cylinder head and can be maintained with ease. The glow plugs are mounted underneath the injection nozzles and are easily accessible as well. On its precombustion chamber side, the cylinder head also has the pushrods necessary for the OHV valve train. The intake and outlet are at the opposite side; the intake manifold is a part of the cylinder head and located at its top.

Valvetrain and fuel system 
The camshaft in the crankcase has a flange to hold the camshaft gear. Between this flange and the camshaft gear, the camshaft has another gear that drives the injection pump. In the centre of the camshaft, a third gear drives the oil pump. The overhead valves have double valve springs; each cylinder has one inlet and one outlet valve of the same size. The valves are pushed by tappets, pushrods and rocker arms. The rocker arms, which are supported in bronze bearings, are lubricated by the wet sump lubrication system. They are secured with a horizontal screw each. The fuel is pumped to the injection nozzles by a Bosch size A injection pump, that is driven by the gear between the flange and camshaft gear on the camshaft. The injection pump has a Hele-Shaw clutch and a pneumatic governor.

Lubrication system and auxiliary devices 
The oil pump is mounted in the centre of the engine in the oil sump and flanged onto the crankcase. It has a small oil pipe with a sieve and a funnel to pump the oil from the sump through the oil filter into the main lubrication oil pipe. The governing valve for setting the oil pressure is easily accessible. The water pump, which also holds the fan, is mounted on the cylinder head on the front of the engine. It is driven by a belt that also drives the governor.

Technical data

References

Notes

Bibliography 
 H. Kremser: Der Aufbau schnellaufender Verbrennungskraftmaschinen für Kraftfahrzeuge und Triebwagen, Springer-Verlag, Wien 1942, pp. 125–130.
 Werner Oswald: Mercedes-Benz Personenwagen 1886-1945. Band 1. Motorbuch Verlag, Stuttgart, 2001, .
Werner Oswald: Mercedes Benz - Lastwagen und Omnibusse 1896-1986. Motorbuch Verlag, Stuttgart 2008, ., pp. 139, 231.
Olaf von Fersen: Ein Jahrhundert Automobiltechnik. Personenwagen. VDI-Verlag, Düsseldorf 1986, ., pp. 38, 282.

External links 
 Photograph of the engine
 Photograph of the engine
 Engineering drawing of the OM 138

Diesel engines by model
OM 138
Straight-four engines